This page summarizes everything related to Estonian football in the year 2022. It contains information about different league systems, national teams, futsal, beach football and most important transfers.

National teams

Men

Senior 
The men's national team took part in the 2020-21 Nations League C-division relegation play-outs, where they played a two legged tie against Cyprus. Estonians managed to score two goals in the opening leg but both of them were later cancelled by VAR and the match therefore ended in a stalemate. Before the second leg, Estonian national team lost a few key players (Mattias Käit fell ill, Maksim Paskotši got injured; Karl Jakob Hein and Märten Kuusk got injured before the first game). In the end, Estonia lost the away game 0–2 and took part in League D in the 2022-23 UEFA Nations League.

Estonia had quite a successful season in League D: they won both games against San Marino and Malta by scoring last minute goals. Therefore Estonia got promoted back to League C on their first try.

At the end of the year, the Baltic states contested the 29th Baltic Cup. Due to only having two possible matchdays, it was decided that the 2022 tournament will be held as a knock-out tournament. Iceland was invited to be the fourth team. Estonia lost its first match against Latvia on penalties and therefore could not defend their 2020 Baltic Cup win. In the third-place match Estonia beat Lithuania.

Youth 

U21

Although it was confirmed after the first seven matches of the groupstage that the men's national U21 team will not qualify for the 2023 U21 Euros, the team still has to play three more games in 2022.

U19

U18

U17

U16

U15

Women

Senior 
The national women's team continued their 2023 FIFA World Cup qualification campaign. On 16 December 2021, the Estonian FA declared that Jarmo Matikainen will step down as the head coach of the Estonian women's national football team. On the 18th of January, the Estonian FA announced that the women's national team will have two head coaches: Anastassia Morkovkina and Sirje Roops.

Although Estonians lost 0-9 to France at home, they also managed to win two games against Kazakhstan. In October they managed to win the Baltic Cup after five successive tournaments without a title.

Youth 

U19

On 9 December 2021, the women's national U19 team were placed in pot C in the draw for the qualification round of the 2022 U19 EUROs. The Estonians were placed into the same group as Scotland, Kosovo and Kazakhstan.

U17

On 9 December 2021, the women's national U17 team were placed in pot B in the draw for the qualification round of the 2022 U17 EUROs. The Estonians were placed into the same group as Bulgaria and Georgia.

U15

Futsal

Senior

Beach

League system

Men

Premium liiga 

The 2022 season of Premium liiga was originally supposed to have top nine clubs from the previous season in addition to Esiliiga champions Maardu Linnameeskond. But on two separate occasions two clubs - Viljandi Tulevik, who finished 8th in 2021, and Maardu Linnameeskond, who were the reigning Esiliiga champions -  released a statement, where they confirmed that they will give up their place in the top division and due to financial problems play in the lower divisions. While Tulevik joined Esiliiga, Maardu decided to compete in II liiga. This therefore gave another opportunity to Pärnu Vaprus, who finished last season tenth, and Tallinna Kalev, who was second in Esiliiga, to compete in the Premium liiga. A few days before the beginning of the season, the Estonian FA announced that Tallinna Legion would receive -4 points and a transfer ban for missing multiple licensing dates.

The season ended with Tallinna Flora winning its 14th title. In the end, they were 18 points ahead of second-placed Tallinna Levadia, which is the largest gap between the top two teams in Meistriliiga since 2009. In addition, no team has ever gained more points in a season than Flora did in 2022. While Levadia finished second, Paide managed to get ahead of Kalju in the penultimate round by beating them 1–0. The season was also historical for fifth-placed Kuressaare who had never finished higher than the seventh place. Likewise, newcomer Tallinna Kalev had not received as many points as they did in 2022 since 2007. At first Pärnu Vaprus, who finished last, was supposed to be relegated to Esiliiga but after Tallinna Legion announced that due to financial difficulties they will play in Esiliiga, Vaprus got readmitted to the division.

FCI Levadia's Zakaria Beglarishvili was the division's top scorer with 21 goals. The top assister was Tallinna Kalev's Ioan Yakovlev, who managed to assist 13 goals. Flora's Konstantin Vassiljev was given the Meistriliiga Player of the Year trophy. In addition Paide's Robi Saarma was named as the Fans Player of the Year by Soccernet.ee readers.

Relegation play-off:

|}

Esiliiga 

The 2022 season of Esiliiga had six competitors from last years Esiliiga and four newcomers. While last year's champion Maardu Linnameeskond got promoted to Premium liiga, the top divisions eight team - Viljandi Tulevik - was relegated due to financial difficulties. The other three teams all came from Esiliiga B: Viimsi and Harju Laagri will be debuting in the second division, whereas Ida-Virumaa Alliance returns after spending one year in Esiliiga B. They replace Tartu Welco, Tartu Tammeka U21 and Pärnu, who got relegated after last season. On the 4th of February Maardu Linnameeskond announced that due to financial difficulties they also cannot compete in the top division. Unlike Viljandi, they decided to compete in II liiga and therefore Tallinna Kalev got promoted and Pärnu got readmitted to Esiliiga.

In the penultimate round newcomer Harju Laagri defeated Pärnu 4:0, which crowned them champions of the division. FCI Levadia's reserve team finished second with 68 points and Elva completed the podium with the third place. On the other end of the table Pärnu and Viljandi Tulevik got relegated to Esiliiga B. The promotion/relegation play-offs did not add any new teams to the division because while Elva lost its promotion play-off to Tallinna Legion, Ida-Virumaa Alliance managed to narrowly beat Esiliiga B-s third-best Tallinna Kalev U21.

The best goalscorer was Nõmme United's 17-year-old Egert Õunapuu, who got 36 goals in 26 games. The young attacker was later named the best player of the season beating both Levadia U21's Daniel Luts and Harju Laagri's Roman Sobtšenko.

Relegation play-off:

|}

Esiliiga B 

In comparison to the previous year, the tenth season of Esiliiga B had five new clubs in the division. While Viimsi, Harju Laagri and Ida-Virumaa Alliance got promoted, they are replaced by Tartu Welco, Tartu Tammeka U21 and Pärnu, who join the division after spending respectively one, three and two season in Esiliiga. On the other side of the table, Vändra Vaprus and Nõmme Kalju U21, who had spent the last nine years in the top three divisions, got relegated to II liiga. They were replaced by debutants Raplamaa and Tartu Kalev. On the 4th of February Maardu Linnameeskond announced that due to financial difficulties they cannot compete in the top division. Due to them deciding to play in the II liiga, Nõmme Kalju U21, who finished the previous year second to last, got readmitted to Esiliiga B and Pärnu JK, who was relegated due to losing the relegation play-offs, was also readmitted to Esiliiga.

Within the first few months Tabasalu managed to separate itself from the other teams. Slowly, FC Tallinn, who did not lose any of their last 27 games, joined them at the top. The champion of the division was crowned in the last round, when the top two teams went head-to-head. Tallinn, who had to win the game, went ahead on the 8th minute and held on to the lead for almost the whole match: Tabasalu got their first goal on the 90th minute. A few moments later Tallinn scored another goal, which gave them the divisions title in the presence of 381 spectators. While Tabasalu and Tallinn were promoted to Esiliiga, Raplamaa, who had the least amount of points in Esiliiga B's history, and Nõmme Kalju U21 got relegated to II liiga.

FC Tallinn's 16-year-old Maksim Kalimullin finished the season as the best goalscorer with 33 goals in 29 games. The second-best goalscorer, Tabasalu's Tristan Pajo, was voted as the player of the season, beating both Kalimullin and Tallinna Kalev U21's Kenlou Laasner.

Relegation play-off:

|}

|}

II liiga 

On 16 December 2021, it was decided that due to the last season being cancelled prematurely, the two II liiga divisions will have 16 clubs in 2022 instead of the usual 14 teams. Therefore, no teams were relegated and the four III liiga champions were promoted. One month later, the Estonian FA announced that the earlier plan had been repealed. The season starts on the 26th of March and consists of 26 rounds. Reserve teams, which do not have "U21" or "U19" in their name, are ineligible for promotion.

North / East  
The North/East division had little change in comparison to the previous year: only two new clubs have entered the league: the promoted Tartu Kalev was replaced by III liiga East's second-placed Jõhvi Phoenix, who will be debuting in II liiga, and Põhja-Tallinna Volta, who held last place when the previous season had been stopped, went to II liiga S/W, whereas Viimsi II will try their luck in the II liiga N/E. On the 4th of February Maardu Linnameeskond announced that due to financial difficulties they cannot compete in the top division. Therefore they decided to take their reserve teams place in II liiga, while the reserve team was disbanded. Two weeks after the news containing Maardu Linnameeskond, the FA announced that Lasnamäe Ajax would be transferred to II liiga S/W and FC Tallinn U21 will get promoted after finishing the previous season in III liiga West third.

South / West  
For the second year in a row Kose, who was in the bottom two, managed to get readmitted to the league. Instead, 10th placed Raasiku Joker, who had been in II liiga or higher since 2013, and Rummu Dünamo decided against taking part of the 2022 II liiga. In addition, Viimsi II, Viljandi Tulevik U21 (dissolved) and Raplamaa (promoted to Esiliiga B) also left the division. These four teams were replaced by Nõmme Kalju U21, Vändra Vaprus (both relegated from Esiliiga B), Nõmme United U21 and Harju Laagri U21 (both at the top of III liiga West). Kuressaare and Pärnu Vaprus had their reserve teams change their names from "II" to "U21" for them to be eligible for promotion. On the 4th of February Maardu Linnameeskond announced that due to financial difficulties they cannot compete in the top division. Therefore due to them deciding to play in II liiga, Nõmme Kalju U21 was readmitted to Esiliiga B. A few weeks later, the FA announced that in addition to Nõmme Kalju U21 getting promoted, Põhja-Tallinna Volta decided against playing in the fourth tier. That gave an opportunity to Tabasalu U21, who finished the previous season's III West season fourth.

Champion's match: 

Relegation play-off: 

|-

|}

|-

|}

III liiga 

The III liiga's competition format is the same as in the previous seasons. Each group has eleven or twelve competitors from which the first club gets promoted to II liiga and the second-placed team takes part in the promotion play-offs, where North - East and South - West go head-to-head. The winners from both pairs go against the 12th teams in II liiga. The clubs, which finish the year 11th and 12th, get relegated to IV liiga. The 10th team takes part of the relegation play-offs. As usual, reserve teams, which have their main team in II liiga, are ineligible for promotion. These teams are Tartu Welco X (South), Rakvere Tarvas II (East) and Tallinna Flora IV (West). The season starts on the 9th of April.

Group A (North) 
The 2022 III liiga North division had two newcomers: the previous season's IV liiga champion Tallinna Wolves and second-placed Tallinna Olympic Olybet - who was most recently in the league in 2019 - will replace Tallinna Dünamo, who did not enter the league system this year. In addition, Tallinna Pocarr changed its name to Tallinna Cosmos.

Group B (South) 
The South group had only one new team in the division: Tartu Kalev entered its reserve team to the competition. Due to two clubs leaving - Paide Linnameeskond IV and Viljandi Tulevik III - the division only had eleven entrants. There was also one name change: Põhja-Sakala changed its name back to Suure-Jaani United.

Group C (East) 
III liiga East division had five newcomers. While Põhja-Tallinna Volta and Raasiku Joker, who have recently been in Esiliiga B, decided to step down from II liiga to III liiga, Kuusalu Kalev and Tallinna TransferWise got promoted from the sixth division. In addition, FCI Levadia also put out a third team called Tallinna Levadia U19. The four teams, which left the league, were Jõhvi Phoenix, Tallinn II (both promoted to II liiga), Lasnamäe Ajax II and Kohtla-Järve Järve III (both dissolved). Before the beginning of the season, Põhja-Tallinn also decided to not take part in the league system and therefore the East group had only eleven entrants in two years in a row.

Group D (West) 
The 2022 III liiga West division had the most changes in its line-up. There were six new entrant - Rummu Dünamo (relegated from II liiga), Tallinna Jalgpallihaigla, Tallinna Rumori Calcio (both promoted from IV liiga), Tabasalu Ulasabat, Tallinna Flora IV and Pärnu Tervis (all three did not compete in the previous year) - and six teams, who left the league - Nõmme United U21, Harju Laagri II (got promoted to II liiga), Tabasalu II, Rummu Dünamo II, Tallinna Legion III (all dissolved) and Kernu Kadakas (relegated to IV liiga). One of the newcomers, Pärnu Tervis, had three players, who played in Meistriliiga the previous year.

Champion's match: 

Relegation play-off: 
The relegation play-offs were not held in 2023 because there were not enough teams interested in getting promoted to III liiga.

IV liiga 
The 2022 season of IV liiga will differ from the previous year's: although the division has as many entrants as in the previous season (26), the clubs voted to have two regions with 13 members. In the first round, every team in the same region will play each other once. In the second round, the table is split into two, as teams ranked 1.-7. and 8.-13. will play five or six games more. At the end of the season, clubs placed in the top four get the opportunity to get promoted to III liiga. Fifth and sixth teams can take part in the promotion play-offs against III liiga's 10th-placed clubs. The season starts on the 24th of April and the first round concludes on the 21st of August.

North / South

North / West

Women

Naiste Meistriliiga 

Relegation play-off:

|}

Naiste Esiliiga

Futsal

Coolbet saaliliiga 
The highest division of futsal in Estonia began on 29 October 2021. Unlike previous seasons, this year the division had ten different clubs due to the COVID-19 pandemic, which stopped 2021 Esiliiga season earlier than expected. Therefore, the top teams could not be decided and three teams competed for another two spots. Sillamäe Kalev and Rõuge Saunamaa managed to get promoted by being ahead of Aruküla Radius. In addition, Tartu Maksimum Welco - who finished 2021 Coolbet saaliliiga in 7th place - merged with Jõgeva Wolves. The team decided to take the Jõgeva-based team's name. While in the previous seasons only six teams have qualified to the final play-offs, then due to the increase of teams, eight teams will get to participate after the main season has ended. Every team will start in the quarterfinals.

Main phase:

Play-offs:

Relegation play-off:

|}

Saalijalgpalli Esiliiga 
Futsal's second division was for the first time in five years the lowest division in Estonia: due to lack of clubs interested in II liiga, the third division was cancelled for this season and the remaining teams were promoted to Esiliiga. Therefore, Rantipol Võru Helios, Otepää Ravens (formerly known as Otepää Kanepi vald) and Äksi Wolves were all promoted to Esiliiga. In addition, Tallinna Cosmos II returns after a four-year hiatus and Jõhvi Phoenix makes its debut. These teams replace Rõuge Saunamaa, Sillamäe Alexela (both promoted), Jõgeva Wolves (merged with Tartu Maksimum Welco) and Viimsi Smsraha U19 (did not compete in the league system).

The season was largely dominated by Tallinna Cosmos II who won the league for the second time after 2018. For the second time in Esiliigas history, the winner did not lose any games (same happened in 2014 with Tallinna Ararat TTÜ, although Ararat played two games less). Cosmos II's only point loss came against Narva Ganza, who drew 4-4 with them. The best team, which was eligible for promotion, was Aruküla Radius who lost only four games. Rantipol Võru Helios reached the promotion play-offs on its debut season. The seasons best goalscorer also came from Võru: Rantipols attacker Eduard Desjatski scored 30 goals. Most assists were given by Radius' Rando Randjõe.

Beach

Cup competitions

Tipneri karikavõistlused 

Home teams listed on top of bracket. (AET): At Extra Time, (PL): Premium liiga, (ELB): Esiliiga B

Small Cup 

Home teams listed on top of bracket. (AET): At Extra Time, (II): II liiga, (III): III liiga

Women's Cup 

Home teams listed on top of bracket. (AET): At Extra Time, (PL): Premium liiga, (ELB): Esiliiga B

Futsal Cup 

The 2021-22 Futsal Cup began on the 23rd of November and had sixteen competitors. There were nine teams from Coolbet Saaliliiga and seven teams from Esiliiga. The three teams, who took part in the league system, but decided against competing in the cup competition, were Sillamäe Alexela (Coolbet Saaliliiga), Tallinna Cosmos II and Kadrina Vitamin Well (both Esiliiga). In the end, Viimsi Smsraha and Tallinna Cosmos reached the final, which meant that for the first time in Futsal Cup history, the competition had the same two finalists in successive seasons. 

Home teams listed on top of bracket. (AET): At Extra Time, (CL): Coolbet saaliliiga, (EL): Esiliiga

Supercups

County competition 

In 2022 Estonian County Competition returned after a hiatus of two years. The ninth round showed a few surprising results: first-placed Harjumaa lost 2-10 to Tartumaa, who has won its last three goals with a goal difference of 28-4. The year was also successful for Põlvamaa, who beat Pärnumaa 6-2. The South Estonian county had not won a game in 90 minutes (excluding penalty shoot-outs) since 2013. The only draw came on the 3rd of September, when both Valgamaa and Tallinn scored two goals.

2022 Fixtures

European competitions 

Due to Estonia being 53rd in the UEFA rankings, only three teams from Estonia can compete in the European competitions. The only club, who plays in the UEFA Champions League, is the reigning champion Tallinna Levadia. For the first time in Estonian football history, they will begin their journey in the preliminary round. In addition, second-placed Tallinna Flora and the Estonian Cup winner Paide Linnameeskond will play in the UEFA Europa Conference League.

Tallinna Levadia

Tallinna Flora

Paide Linnameeskond

Notable transfers 
Transfers are in alphabetical order. Players with "*" behind their name have changed teams inside and outside of Meistriliiga. Player's last team is listed as "free agent" if he has not represented a team in the previous six months. Player's next team is listed as "free agent" if he has not found a new club within the following six months.

Inside Meistriliiga 
Listed are players, who have joined or left a club participating in the 2022 Meistriliiga. The player must have represented the Estonian national team at least once. The list may also contain more known players, who have either changed their club inside the lower leagues or retired from football.

Outside Meistriliiga 
Listed are all Estonian footballers, who have joined or left a foreign team.

Foreign players 
Listed are all foreign players that have joined or left a team participating in the 2022 Meistriliiga.

Managerial changes 
Listed are all clubs, who play in the top divisions (Meistriliiga, Esiliiga, Esiliiga B), and national teams who changed managers after the end of the 2021 season.

References 

 
2022 in association football
Seasons in Estonian football